The Rescues are an American rock band from Los Angeles, California, formed in 2008. Their music can be classified as indie pop/rock, and is notable for its use of three and four-part vocal harmonies.

History 
"The Rescues" were formed in 2008 by singer/songwriters and multi instrumentalists Kyler England, Adrianne Gonzalez and Gabriel Mann, who met while performing on the singer-songwriter circuit in L.A.. While all members had experienced individual success prior to forming the group, the group has proved to be greater than the sum of its parts, sometimes described as an "Indie Supergroup". The Rescues' music has been placed in multiple high-profile TV shows, such as One Tree Hill, Private Practice, Pretty Little Liars, The Umbrella Academy and Grey's Anatomy (the latter featuring five Rescues songs, among them “Break Me Out"). In addition to TV placements, many of their songs have won, and achieved honorable mentions in prestigious songwriting contests such as the USA Songwriting Competition, John Lennon Songwriting Contest and the International Songwriting Competition.

Adrianne Gonzalez won Overall Grand Prize at the 1999 USA Songwriting Competition. Gabriel Mann won Overall Grand Prize in the 2002 USA Songwriting Competition. Kyler England won First Prize in the Country Category at the 2010 USA Songwriting Competition.

The band released their first record, a four-song, self-titled EP in January 2008. It was followed by the album Crazy Ever After, in November of the same year. In June 2010 they released the album Let Loose The Horses, which has garnered notability and acclaim among various online blogs and music review websites.

Their third album Blah Blah Love and War was first released in November 2013 to contributors to their fundraising campaign. The release was delayed slightly due to Hurricane Sandy, which affected the studio where the album was being mastered. All songs are credited to The Rescues, except "Love Like Cyanide" which is credited to The Rescues and Ari Levine.

On June 1, 2017, the band released a self-titled album.

In October 2022, the band's cover of "Don't Dream it's Over by Crowded House" mixed with the instrumentals of their cover "Hold On by Sarah McLachlan" were featured as the main season finale song on the AMC+ series Pantheon.

Discography

Albums 
Crazy Ever After (2008)
Let Loose The Horses (2010)
Blah Blah Love and War (2013)
The Rescues (2017)

Extended plays 
The Rescues (2010)

References

External links 
Official website
Official Uvumi profile
USA Songwriting Competition

Alternative rock groups from California
Musical groups established in 2008
Musical groups from Los Angeles